Crooze FM (styled CROOZE.fm) is a Belgian Jazz radio station created in 2004, broadcasting in Antwerp, Brussels and Ghent and specialized in mainly Jazz, Soul and Lounge. Other genres played regularly on Crooze FM include R&B music, Nu-jazz, Funk, Deep House and Chill.

In 2004 and 2005, Crooze FM was elected in the Radiovisie.be Radio Awards. In 2004 as Best Newcomer and in 2005 Crooze won the awards Best Radiostation and Best Website.

References

Dutch-language radio stations in Belgium
Jazz radio stations
Belgian jazz